Obereopsis nigronotatipes is a species of beetle in the family Cerambycidae. It was described by Maurice Pic in 1940.

References

nigronotatipes
Beetles described in 1940